Too Much Yang is the sixth studio album made by the Norwegian rock band BigBang. It was released in Norway, March 19, 2007, at Warner Music and Grand Sport Records. The album was received generally well by critics in Norway, although it is not considered one of their strongest.

Title 
The name, "Too Much Yang", comes from a Feng Shui book drummer Olaf Olsen bought in Los Angeles. Under a picture of an AmCar, the picture text stated: "an example of too much yang". Øystein Greni decided to use the phrase "Too Much Yang" for the title of the album.

Track listing 
 "Too Much Yang" - 3:17
 "Hurricane Boy" - 2:33
 "I Don't Wanna" - 3:21
 "L.A. Song" - 3:46
 "My First Time" - 3:22
 "The Third Act" - 2:51
 "All the Time" - 2:38
 "A Thousand Times Over" - 3:49
 "Early December" - 3:02
 "We Belong Together" - 2:47
 "Angelina" - 4:03

Personnel 
 Øystein Greni - vocals and guitar
 Olaf Olsen - drums
 Lasse Weeden - bass
 Maria Orieta - vocals (on "L.A. Song")
 Erik Tresselt - vocals (on "All The time" and "We Belong Together")
 Nikolai Eilertsen - vocals (on "We Belong Together")
 David Larring - bass (on "Too Much Yang") and Piano (on "The Third Act")
 Christian Engfelt - bass (on "Hurricane Boy")
 Øyvind Storli Hoel - bass (on "All the Time")
 Lars H. Haugen - guitar (on "My First Time")
 Martin Winstad - congas (on "I Don't Wanna")
 David Wallumrød - piano (on "I Don't Wanna")
 Sindre Røyland, Tone Heidi Borhaug and Janne Solberg - background vocals (on "I Don't Wanna")
 Svein Greni, Tarjei Grimsby and Bjørn Asper - horns (on "We Belong Together" and "I Don't Wanna"
 Kaja Fjellberg Pettersen - cello (on "A Thousand Times Over")
 Nikolai Matthews - doublebass (on "A Thousand Times Over")

References

2007 albums
Bigbang (Norwegian band) albums